The Prudence Island Lighthouse, more commonly known locally as the Sandy Point Lighthouse, is located on  Prudence Island, Rhode Island and is the oldest lighthouse tower in the state. Sandy Point is nicknamed Chibacoweda, meaning "little place separated by a passage", because the location is a little more than one mile offshore.

History
The lighthouse was constructed in 1823 and originally sat on a dike off Goat Island farther south in the Bay, where the Newport Harbor Light stands today. In 1851, it was transported to Prudence Island where it remains.  It is one of the few lighthouses in the United States to retain its original bird-cage lantern.  The light was listed on the National Register of Historic Places in 1988.

1938 New England hurricane 
The lighthouse keeper's house was swept away in the 1938 New England hurricane, and five people were washed out to sea and drowned: 
<li> the keeper's wife, Mrs. George T. Gustavus ( Mable Gertrude Norwood; 1888–1938),
<li> the keeper's son, Edward J. Gustavus (1926–1938),
<li> the former keeper, Martin Thompson (1868–1938),
<li> James George Lynch (1863–1938) and v, his wife, Ellen Lynch ( Ellen Wyatt; 1870–1938) – both of whom had sought refuge at the lighthouse residence.

The lighthouse keeper, George Theodore Gustavus (1884–1976), was also swept into the sea, but was swept back ashore and survived.

See also
National Register of Historic Places listings in Newport County, Rhode Island

References

External links
Lighthouse History
RI Lighthouse History of Prudence Light
National Park Service Prudence site
LighthouseFriends.com

Lighthouses completed in 1823
Lighthouses on the National Register of Historic Places in Rhode Island
Lighthouses in Newport County, Rhode Island
Buildings and structures in Portsmouth, Rhode Island
National Register of Historic Places in Newport County, Rhode Island